Simulation is a 2017 Iranian drama film directed by Abed Abest. It was screened in the Forum section at the 67th Berlin International Film Festival. It was also nominated for best film award in Transilvania International Film Festival (2017) and in Ars Independent Festival (2017).
Simulation also won the best film award in Spain Moving Images Festival (2018) and nominated for the best film in discovery section in Toronto International Film Festival (2017).

Cast
 Abed Abest
 Vahid Rad
 Majid Yousefi
 Danial Khojasteh
 Shahrzad Seifi
 Asghar Piran

References

External links
 

2017 films
2017 drama films
2010s Persian-language films
Iranian drama films